Carlton Main Brickworks is a 15.5 hectare (38.4 acre) geological site of Special Scientific Interest in South Yorkshire. It opened alongside Grimethorpe colliery in the mid-1890s, and has been producing quality bricks for well over a century. The site was notified in 1989.

See also
List of Sites of Special Scientific Interest in South Yorkshire

References
 Carlton Main Brickworks Natural England. Retrieved on 2009-02-12

Sites of Special Scientific Interest notified in 1989
Sites of Special Scientific Interest in South Yorkshire
Brickworks in the United Kingdom
Brierley